Cheryl Y. Hayashi is a biologist who specializes in the evolution and functional properties of spider silk. She is a curator, professor, and director of comparative biology research at the American Museum of Natural History, while also serving as the director of the Institute for Comparative Genomics and Provost of Science. She was a graduate of Yale University, a professor at University California Riverside, and a 2007 MacArthur Fellow.

Education
Hayashi graduated from Iolani High School in 1985 and was a member of the school's first co-educational class. She continued her studies at Yale University, gaining a Bachelor of Science in 1988, Master of Science in 1990, and a Master of Philosophy in 1993. She worked with Catherine Craig, including field work in Panama, becoming interested in spiders when she had the job of hand-feeding the professor's colony of tropical spiders.

She was awarded a PhD in 1996, with her dissertation on the systematics of spiders using ribosomal DNA.

Career
After working as a postdoctoral researcher at the University of Wyoming (1996-2001), Hayashi was a professor at UC Riverside from 2001 to the end of 2016.

Her UC Riverside laboratory's work characterized spiders in the spidroin gene family, including how silk is encoded and studying the basis of molecular diversity in spiders. A variety of techniques, including whole-gene cloning, genomics, biochemistry, and biomechanics, were used to study the evolution of spider silk. Hayashi worked with engineers and biomechanics to understand spider silk, and to develop biomaterials based on spider genetic information.

Hayashi was a speaker at the TED 2010 Conference. She became curator, professor, and Leon Hess Director of Comparative Biology Research at the American Museum of Natural History in January 2017.

Awards
She was the recipient of the MacArthur Fellowship Program in 2007.

References

External links
 "TED 2010 | Cheryl Hayashi: Smooth — and Strong — as Silk", Wired, Kim Zetter, February 10, 2010
 

Living people
Year of birth missing (living people)
ʻIolani School alumni
Yale University alumni
University of California, Riverside faculty
American academics of Japanese descent
MacArthur Fellows
American women biologists
21st-century American biologists
21st-century American women scientists